Michael F. Jacobson (born July 29, 1943), who holds a Ph.D. in microbiology from Massachusetts Institute of Technology, is an American scientist and nutrition advocate.

Jacobson co-founded the Center for Science in the Public Interest in 1971, along with two fellow scientists (James B. Sullivan, Albert J. Fritsch) he met while working at the Center for the Study of Responsive Law in Washington, DC. When his colleagues left CSPI in 1977, Jacobson became its executive director.  In 2017 he was replaced as the executive director by Peter Lurie and held the position of Senior Scientist; he remained on the board of directors of the organization until 2022.  He has been a national leader in the movement for healthier diets, focusing both on education and obtaining laws and regulations. It was Jacobson who coined the now widely used phrases "junk food" and "food porn".  In 2022 Jacobson founded the National Food Museum.

His activities and views

Jacobson and his organization have both publicized healthy diets and criticized a wide variety of foods and beverages as unhealthful. He and CSPI frequently use colorful terms to emphasize their opposition to certain foods, for instance referring to fettuccine alfredo as a "heart attack on a plate."  In addition to publicizing concerns about or praise for foods, Jacobson lobbied for improvements in government (U.S. Food and Drug Administration and U.S. Department of Agriculture) regulations and guidelines and for new legislation.

He founded Food Day, a nationwide celebration of healthy, affordable, and sustainably produced food and a grassroots campaign for better policies. Food Day was celebrated annually from 1975–77 and 2011–15. Jacobson also founded Big Business Day and the Center for the Study of Commercialism.

"Soda is the quintessential junk food—just sugar calories and no nutrients," says Jacobson. "Americans are drowning in soda pop—teenagers, in particular. The average teenage boy is consuming two cans of soda pop a day." Jacobson proposes several warning labels, including "Drinking (non-diet) soft drinks contributes to obesity and tooth decay," and "Consider switching to diet soda, water, or skim milk." He once asked a CBS News reporter: "Obesity is an epidemic. One-third of youths already are overweight or obese. Are we just going to sit around and do nothing? Or should we do something—a modest, sensible step of putting a health message on cans and bottles?"

In 2005, Jacobson's organization proposed mandatory warning labels on all containers of sugar-sweetened soft drinks, to warn consumers about the possible health risks of consuming these beverages on a regular basis.

Beginning in 1993, Jacobson spearheaded efforts to require that artificial trans fat, a potent cause of heart disease, be labeled on food packages.  As evidence of trans fat's harmfulness accumulated, in 2004 CSPI petitioned the Food and Drug Administration to ban the use of partially hydrogenated vegetable oil, the source of artificial trans fat.  The FDA banned that oil in 2015, with June 18, 2018, being the effective date to stop using it.

He also led efforts to reduce the sodium content of processed foods, such as soups, snack foods, and processed meats.  Excess consumption of sodium increases the risk of high blood pressure, heart attacks, and strokes.  In addition to publishing several books and reports, CSPI's work led to the FDA's issuing voluntary sodium-reduction guidelines in October 2021.

To bring about changes in eating habits, Jacobson advocates higher taxes on unhealthy foods, greater use of warning labels on food and beverage packaging, restrictions on advertising and selling junk foods (“snack foods"), and lawsuits against food producers and retailers whose practices he believes are detrimental to public health. His publicity campaigns and legal actions regarding such harmful ingredients as urethane (a carcinogen) in alcoholic beverages, sulfite preservatives (deadly allergen) in fresh vegetables, wine, and other foods; sodium nitrate and sodium nitrite (sources of cancer-causing nitrosamines) in bacon and other processed meats; olestra (an artificial fat); and acrylamide (a carcinogenic contaminant) in baked and fried foods led to governmental restrictions or voluntary actions to reduce or eliminate those substances. Jacobson led the effort to get "Added Sugars" listed on Nutrition Facts labels.

Jacobson stepped down as executive director of CSPI in October 2017 and then, as a senior scientist at CSPI, published Salt Wars: The Battle Over the Biggest Killer in the American Diet..  That book addresses the scientific controversy about the health impact of lowering sodium consumption, industry opposition to government action to lower sodium, and advice to consumers.

In 2022, after he resigned from CSPI's board of directors and his position as senior scientist, Jacobson founded the National Food Museum.  That nascent institution "explores food in all its dimensions."    The museum's exhibits and other activities will focus on the history of the human and American diets, food marketing, ethnic cuisines, farm animal welfare, and, especially, the impact of food and farming on health and the environment.

Criticism
Due to the public-interest passion he brings to his efforts and in part to his criticisms of the food industry, Jacobson's methods have been questioned by the libertarian community, with the Center for Consumer Freedom awarding him "nanny of the year" on three occasions. Some argue that parents have control over their children's diet and can moderate their intake of sugar-sweetened soft drinks. However, Jacobson contends that "kids know about vending machines, and they can go to 7-Eleven and get a Big Gulp which contains half a gallon—a thousand calories, almost!—of soda pop in a single serving... We've come a long way from the six-and-a-half ounce Coke bottles some 50 years ago."

Works written by Jacobson 

Eater's Digest: The Consumer's Fact-Book of Food Additives, Doubleday & Company Inc. (1972) ASIN B000H7GB4K
How Sodium Nitrite Can Affect Your Health, Center for Science in the Public Interest (1973)
Nutrition Scoreboard: your guide to better eating, Center for Science in the Public Interest (1973). Avon Books (1974)
The Changing American Diet, Center for Science in the Public Interest (Two editions: 1973, 1978)
Booze Merchants: The Inebriating of America. Jacobson, Robert Atkins, George Hacker. Center for Science in the Public Interest (1983), 
 The Complete Eater’s Digest and Nutrition Scoreboard. Jacobson. Anchor Books (1985).
Salt: The Brand Name Guide to Sodium Content. Bonnie F. Liebman, Jacobson, Greg Moyer. Warner Books; Reissue edition (1985). 
The Fast-Food Guide. Jacobson, Sarah Fritschner. Workman Publishing Co. (1986) 
Marketing Booze to Blacks, Center for Science in the Public Interest (1987) 
''Tainted Booze. Charles P. Mitchell, Jacobson. Center for Science in the Public Interest (1988) 
Marketing Disease to Hispanics: The Selling of Alcohol, Tobacco, and Junk Foods. Center for Science in the Public Interest (1989)  
The Completely Revised and Updated Fast-Food Guide: What's Good, What's Bad, and How to Tell the Difference. Jacobson, Sarah Fritschner. Workman Publishing Co.; 2nd Revised & Updated edition (1992) 
Safe Food: Eating Wisely in a Risky World.  Jacobson, Lisa Y. Lefferts, Anne Witte Garland. Living Planet Press (1993) 
What Are We Feeding Our Kids? Jacobson, Bruce Maxwell. Workman Publishing Co. (1994) 
Marketing Madness: A Survival Guide for a Consumer Society. Jacobson, Laurie Ann Mazur. Westview Press (1995) 
Diet, ADHD & Behavior: A Quarter-Century Review. Jacobson, David Schardt. Center for Science in the Public Interest (1999, with update 2009)
Restaurant Confidential. Jacobson, Jayne Hurley. Workman Publishing Co. (2002) 
Salt: The Forgotten Killer, Center for Science in the Public Interest (2005)
Liquid Candy: How Soft Drinks are Harming Americans' Health, Center for Science in the Public Interest (2007)
Salt Wars: The Battle Over the Biggest Killer in the American Diet, MIT Press. (2020)

References

External links 
Center for Science in the Public Interest

Living people
American nutritionists
Diet food advocates
20th-century American Jews
American microbiologists
1943 births
21st-century American Jews